Sphex pensylvanicus, the great black wasp, is a species of digger wasp. The larvae feed on living insects that the females paralyze and carry to the underground nest.

Distribution
S. pensylvanicus is distributed across most of the contiguous United States and northern Mexico. During the late 20th century, its range expanded north to New York and the Canadian provinces of Quebec and Ontario.

Description
Sphex pensylvanicus is a large, black wasp, significantly larger than their congener Sphex ichneumoneus (the great golden digger wasp). According to John Bartram, "The sting of this Wasp is painful, but does not swell like others". As well as being larger than S. ichneumoneus, they are also darker, with smoky wings and an entirely black body, where S. ichneumoneus has yellow wings, red legs, and a partly red abdomen.

Ecology and life cycle

Adult females of S. pensylvanicus build an underground nest which they provision with various orthopteran insects, particularly of the genera Microcentrum, Amblycorypha and Scudderia. Prey are stung three times, once in the neck and twice in the thorax, and are paralyzed by the wasp's sting, although they can survive for weeks. The prey are then carried to the nest. While collecting their prey, the females are vulnerable to kleptoparasitism, in which birds, including the house sparrow (Passer domesticus) and the grey catbird (Dumetella carolinensis), steal the prey that the wasp has collected.

Each of the several chambers in the nest houses a single larva, which consumes 2–6 katydids or grasshoppers.

S. pensylvanicus is an important pollinator of plants including the milkweeds Asclepias syriaca and A. incarnata. It has also been reported on Daucus carota, Eryngium yuccifolium, Melilotus albus, Monarda punctata
, and Pycnanthemum virginianum S. pensylvanicus is one of several species of Sphex to be parasitized by the strepsipteran Paraxenos westwoodi.

Taxonomic history
Sphex pensylvanicus was the subject of the first article on an insect written by a native of the New World, when observations made by John Bartram on S. pensylvanicus were presented to the Royal Society in 1749 by Peter Collinson. Sphex pensylvanicus was described by Carl Linnaeus in his 1763 work Centuria Insectorum, using material sent to him by Charles De Geer.

References

External links

Sphecidae
Hymenoptera of North America
Insects described in 1763
Taxa named by Carl Linnaeus